The Bass Coast Shire is a local government area in Victoria, Australia, located in the southeastern part of the state. It includes the towns of Bass, Cape Paterson, Cape Woolamai, Corinella, Coronet Bay, Cowes, Inverloch, Kilcunda, Lang Lang, Newhaven, Rhyll, San Remo, Summerlands and Wonthaggi as well as the historic locality of Krowera. It also includes the popular tourist destination Phillip Island. It was formed in 1994 from the amalgamation of the Shire of Bass, Shire of Phillip Island, Borough of Wonthaggi, parts of the Shire of Woorayl, Shire of Korumburra and City of Cranbourne.

The Shire is governed and administered by the Bass Coast Shire Council; its seat of local government and administrative centre is the council headquarters in Wonthaggi, with other service centres located in Cowes, Grantville and Inverloch. The Shire is named after its most precious asset, the coasts of Bass Strait and Western Port.

Council

Current composition
The council is composed of three wards and nine councillors, with three councillors elected to represent each ward.

Administration and governance
The council meets in the council chambers at the council headquarters in the Wonthaggi Municipal Offices, which is also the location of the council's administrative activities. It also provides customer services at both its administrative centre in Wonthaggi, and its service centre in Cowes.

Townships and localities
The 2021 census, the shire had a population of 40,789 up from 32,804 in the 2016 census

^ - Territory divided with another LGA
* - Not noted in 2016 Census
# - Not noted in 2021 Census

Facilities 
 Local markets

Cape Paterson
 Swimming Rockpool – Safety Beach, Browns Bay, Surf Beach Road
 Bunurong Marine Park

Wonthaggi
 Lower Powlett Road – Williamsons Beach, Powlett River, Wonthaggi Wind Farm and Victorian Desalination Plant (tours and walking/cycling/horse riding)
 Bass Coast Rail Trail – walk/cycle/horse trot
 Historic mine whistle – sounds 12 noon every day in the centre of Wonthaggi, mine shaft tower, Apex Park, Murray Street
 Wonthaggi Museum – open Saturday mornings, Murray Street
 State Coal Mine – museum and tours, Garden Street
 Coal mine ruins – Number 5 Brace & the McBride tunnel entry, off West Area Road Wonthaggi and scattered around the region
 Wonthaggi Golf Course – 18 hole, par 72, ACR 70, easy walk, McKenzie Street
 Large chain stores
 Wonthaggi Hospital – Smoking ban, Graham Street

Phillip Island
 Phillip Island Penguin Parade
 Australian motorcycle Grand Prix
 Pyramid Rock Festival on New Year's Eve
 Nobbies Centre at Seal Rocks

Krowera
 Garlic Farm, Olive Farm, Wayside Lookout, Dairy Farms

Kilcunda
 Kilcunda Trestle Bridge

Inverloch
 Inverloch Shell Museum and Dinosaur Exhibition

Protected areas
Collecting empty seashells, driftwood, twigs, sea glass and other non-living materials or interesting rubbish of small size and in small quantities is legal from most beaches along the Bass Coast, with the exception of Wilsons Promontory, the Bunurong Marine National Park and most of Phillip Island.

On Phillip Island most beaches are off-limits for shell collecting and are run by Phillip Island Nature Parks, with the exceptions of Ventnor, Cowes, Rhyll and Newhaven.

The Bunurong Marine National Park is a middle outstretching section of Bunurong Marine Park along the coastline of Harmers Haven, Cape Paterson and Inverloch. The restricted zone (Bunurong Marine National Park inside Bunurong Marine Park) is an area south-west past Cape Paterson's Safety Beach and Undertow Bay; namely The Oaks, Twin Reefs, Shack Bay and Eagles Nest.

See also
List of places on the Victorian Heritage Register in Bass Coast Shire
Mornington Peninsula and Western Port Biosphere Reserve

References

External links

Bass Coast Shire Council official website
Metlink local public transport map
Link to Land Victoria interactive maps
Bass Coast Security

Local government areas of Victoria (Australia)
Gippsland (region)